HMS Scarborough was a 32-gun fifth rate vessel built at Woolwich Dockyard in 1693/94. Shortly after commissioning she was taken by two French privateers and went under French service. She was recaptured in 1697 and renamed Milford. She spent some time off Africa then the West Indies. She was rebuilt in 1705. She was in the North Sea, the Mediterranean and finally the West Indies where she was wrecked in 1720.

She was the second vessel to bear the name Scarborough since it was used for a 10-gun ketch, built by Frame of Scarborough 2 May 1691 and captured by the French on 12 January 1693.

As HMS Milford she was the fourth named vessel since it was used for a 22-gun ship built by Page of Wivenhoe in 1654 and named Fagons. She was renamed Milford at the Restoration in May 1660 and burnt by accident at Leghorn on 7 July 1673.

Construction and Specifications
She was ordered on 10 March 1693 to be built at Woolwich Dockyard under the guidance of Master Shipwright Joseph Lawrence. She was launched on 15 February 1694. Her builder's measure tonnage was calculated as 374 tons (burthen).

The gun armament initially was four demi-culverins on the lower deck (LD) with two pair of guns per side. The upper deck (UD) battery would consist of between twenty and twenty-two sakers guns with ten or eleven guns per side. The gun battery would be completed by four to six minions guns on the quarterdeck (QD) with two to three guns per side.

Commissioned Service

Service 1694
She was commissioned under the command of Captain Thomas Killingworth for service in the Irish Channel. She was taken by the French privateers, the 36-gun Le Comte de Revel and the 22-gun L'Etoille off Tory Island, Northern Ireland on 18 July 1694. 32 of the crew were killed including Captain Killingworth and 10 wounded. She was incorporated into the privateer squadron and renamed Le Duc de Chaulnes. She was recaptured on 15 September 1697 by HMS Plymouth and HMS Rye and renamed HMS Milford. She was recommissioned in 1700 under Captain William Moses for service on the coast of Africa. In 1701 she was attending on the King of Holland. In 1702 she was under Captain John Anderson. On 12 March 1703 she was assigned Captain Edward Windsor for service in the West Indies. On her return she was ordered to be rebuilt at Deptford in 1705.

Rebuild at Deptford Dockyard 1705
She was ordered rebuilt at Deptford Dockyard under the guidance of Master Shipwright Joseph Allin. She was launched/completed in December 1705. Her builder's measure tonnage was calculated as 420 tons (burthen). Her armament was 36 guns wartime and 30 guns peacetime, consisting of eight/six 12-pounder guns on the lower deck (LD), twenty-two/twenty 6-pounder guns on the upper deck (UD), and six/four 6-pounder guns on the quarterdeck (QD).

Service 1705-1720
She was commissioned in December 1705 under the command of Captain Philip Stanhope. She was off Ostend in June 1706 with Vice-Admiral Sir Stafford Fairborne to co-operate with the army in the siege of the town. The ships bombarded the town during the landing of troops and Ostend capitulated on 25 June. In conjunction with HMS Fowey drove ashore and burnt the 60-gun Content then took the French 42-gun Le Mercure on 8 January 1707. In March she was escorting HMS Resolution conveying the Earl of Peterborough to Italy. The small convoy was spotted by a group of French ships. The Earl transferred to Enterprise and escaped to Leghorn along with Milford. Resolution went ashore and was burnt to avoid capture. She was in action at Minorca where Captain Stanhope was killed, on 17 September 1708. In September 1708 she came under the command of Captain John Goodhall (until 1715) serving with Whittaker's Squadron in the winter of 1708/09 and remaining in the Mediterranean during 1709. She sailed with a Newfoundland convoy then returned to the Mediterranean in 1711/12. She return to Home Waters in 1715 and underwent a small repair at Woolwich costing 1,099.11.9d between September 1715 and February 1716. She was commissioned in 1718 under Captain Peter Chamberlain for service at Jamaica.

Loss
She was wrecked on Cape Corrientes, Cuba on 18 June 1720 with the loss of most of her crew including Captain Chamberlain.

Notes

Citations

References

 Winfield (2009), British Warships in the Age of Sail (1603 – 1714), by Rif Winfield, published by Seaforth Publishing, England © 2009, EPUB 
 Winfield (2007), British Warships in the Age of Sail (1714 – 1792), by Rif Winfield, published by Seaforth Publishing, England © 2007, EPUB 
 Colledge (2020), Ships of the Royal Navy, by J.J. Colledge, revised and updated by Lt Cdr Ben Warlow and Steve Bush, published by Seaforth Publishing, Barnsley, Great Britain, © 2020, EPUB 
 Lavery (1989), The Arming and Fitting of English Ships of War 1600 - 1815, by Brian Lavery, published by US Naval Institute Press © Brian Lavery 1989, Part V Guns, Type of Guns
 Clowes (1898), The Royal Navy, A History from the Earliest Times to the Present (Vol. II). London. England: Sampson Low, Marston & Company, © 1898

 

1690s ships
Frigates of the Royal Navy
Ships of the Royal Navy